The Best of the Columbia Years: 1943–1952 is a four-disc box set by the American singer Frank Sinatra, released on Legacy Records in 1995, catalogue C4K-64681. Initial release was in a book-style edition; a later edition was reissued in 1998 with a standard jewel case package and given a different catalogue number, C4K-65620. All but twelve tracks were originally released on 78 rpm records, and as an overview of Sinatra's recordings on Columbia this set replaces the previous catalogue item The Voice: The Columbia Years (1943-1952), released in 1986 on vinyl and later also on compact disc. The box set contains highlights of his career with Columbia Records; the complete recordings from these years were released in 1993 on The Columbia Years 1943-1952: The Complete Recordings.

Content
These recordings comprise the first phase of Sinatra's solo career, after his apprenticeship in the swing bands of Harry James and Tommy Dorsey, Sinatra having signed with Columbia on June 1, 1943. At that time, the Petrillo recording ban was on, and the first two tracks of the box reflect this situation, a cappella recordings of Frank with a backing vocal group. A second recording ban took place in 1948, and Sinatra again recorded with vocals only on the track "Nature Boy." The rest of the recordings featured instrumental backing with few exceptions arranged by Axel Stordahl, Sinatra's mainstay during the Columbia period. The bulk of the selections on this package date from the 1940s, with only the disc four covering the declining years of his career while on the label in the 1950s.

Beginning with disc four track five, Columbia simultaneously released these records as 45 rpm singles, the new format having been introduced by its rival RCA Records in 1949. Disc one tracks 19 through 21, and disc two tracks four through six, were issued as part of Sinatra's very first album, a package of four records entitled The Voice of Frank Sinatra, which peaked at #1 on the fledgling album chart. Disc four tracks six through nine were also included on the Columbia ten-inch album Sing and Dance with Frank Sinatra, catalogue CL-6143.

Disc two track 22, "Sweet Lorraine," features Sinatra with the 1946 Metronome All-Stars: Charlie Shavers, Lawrence Brown, Johnny Hodges, Coleman Hawkins, Harry Carney, Nat King Cole, Bob Ahern, Eddie Safranski, and Buddy Rich. Disc three- track 2, "My Romance," is a duet with Dinah Shore, and disc three -track 23, "Let's Take An Old-Fashioned Walk," is a duet with Doris Day.

Select personnel
 Frank Sinatra — vocals
 Axel Stordahl, George Siravo, Jeff Alexander — arrangements
 Felix Slatkin — violin
 Eleanor Slatkin — cello
 Mitch Miller — oboe
 Johnny Guarnieri, Bill Miller — piano
 Dave Barbour, Barney Kessel, Allan Reuss, George Van Eps — guitars
 Bob Haggart — bass
 Nick Fatool, Alvin Stoller — drums

Track listing
Columbia 78 catalogue numbers and chart positions taken from Sinatra Family website singles discography

Disc one

Disc two

Disc three

Disc four

‡denotes United Kingdom release

References

1998 greatest hits albums
Frank Sinatra compilation albums